is a former Japanese football player.

Playing career
Kanamori was born in Ise on April 2, 1982. After graduating from high school, he joined J2 League club Oita Trinita in 2001. However he could not play at all in the match until 2002. Trinita won the champions in 2002 season and was promoted to J1 League from 2003. On April 23, he debuted as substitute defender against Kyoto Purple Sanga in 2003 J.League Cup. However he could only play this match. In October 2003, he moved to Regional Leagues club Okinawa Kariyushi FC on loan. In 2004, he returned to Trinita. However he could only play 2 matches in J.League Cup. In October 2004, he moved to Japan Football League club Ehime FC. He became a regular player as center back soon. Ehime won the champions in 2005 season and was promoted to J2. Although he played many matches until 2009, his opportunity to play decreased from 2010. He could not play at all in the match in 2011 and retired end of 2011 season.

Club statistics

References

External links

1982 births
Living people
Association football people from Mie Prefecture
Japanese footballers
J1 League players
J2 League players
Japan Football League players
Oita Trinita players
Ehime FC players
Association football defenders